Kuyakh may refer to:
 Bala Kuyakh
 Pain Kuyakh